Federal Route 123, or Jalan Rasau Kerteh Selatan and Jalan Jerangau-Jabor (Penghantar 4), is a federal road in Terengganu, Malaysia.

Features

At most sections, the Federal Route 123 was built under the JKR R5 road standard, allowing maximum speed limit of up to 90 km/h.

List of junctions and towns

References

Malaysian Federal Roads